The spesmilo (plural spesmiloj ) is an obsolete decimal international currency, proposed in 1907 by René de Saussure and used before World War I by a few British and Swiss banks, primarily the Ĉekbanko Esperantista.

The spesmilo was equivalent to one thousand spesoj, and worth  of pure gold (0.8 grams of 22 karat gold), which at the time was about one-half United States dollar, two shillings (one-tenth of a pound sterling) in Britain, one Russian ruble, or  Swiss francs. On 6 November 2022, that quantity of gold would be worth about US$43.50, £38 sterling, €44, ₽2692 Russian roubles, and SFr 43 Swiss francs.

The basic unit, the speso (from Italian spesa or German Spesen; spesmilo is Esperanto for "a thousand pennies"), was purposely made very small to avoid fractions.

Sign

The spesmilo sign, called spesmilsigno in Esperanto, is a monogram of a cursive capital "S", from whose tail emerges an "m". The currency sign is often typeset as the separate letters Sm. 

In Unicode, the character is assigned  in version 5.2.

Miscellaneous
 The stelo was another currency unit used by the Universala Ligo from 1942 to the 1990s.
 An Esperanto version of the board game Monopoly uses play money in denominations of spesmiloj.

References

External links

 "Streboj al internacia mono" 
 Images of Stelo coins
 ACBN Article about Esperanto coins

Modern obsolete currencies
Esperanto culture
Currency symbols
Alternative currencies
Currencies introduced in 1907
Currencies of Europe